Jerreley Zanian John Slijger (born June 18, 1986), known by his stage name Kempi, is a Dutch rapper of Curaçaoan descent.

From 2006 to 2012, Kempi was signed at Dutch label TopNotch. He released two studio albums, four EP's and seven mixtapes to date. In 2008, Kempi was named "Best Hip-Hop Artist" in the Netherlands at the prestigious State Awards. Beside his artistic activities, Kempi is also notorious for his extensive criminal record.

Early life
Kempi was born in Helmond and grew up in Woensel-West, a deprived neighborhood in Eindhoven, as the fourth of seven children. As a teenager he went to a school for children with behavioral problems and started to participate in criminal activities, such as dealing in cocaine and heroin. He built a very extensive criminal record, including various prison sentences.

Musical career
Influenced by Tupac Shakur, Lil Wayne, and Dutch rapper Duvel, Kempi began to write down his street-life experiences, but wasn't seriously into hip-hop yet. However, after performing in a hip-hop group named Drama, Kempi got encouraged to make his own music, and subsequently recorded his own mixtape Tsss Kempi in 2006 which was downloaded at least forty thousand times from the internet. Kempi began to gain national prominence and was noticed by record label owner Kees de Koning, who offered him a contract on his label TopNotch which Kempi signed in jail. When Kempi signed the contract (September 2006) he was under suspicion of complicity in a stabbing; he was later found guilty. Kempi came out of custody after his second mixtape Rap 'N Borie (English: Rap 'N Crack) and third mixtape Mixtape 3.1 were released.

On July 17, 2007 Kempi met his father for the first time and his girlfriend gave birth to a son, motivating him to try to be a businessman and a father. On September 19, 2008, Kempi's second son was born. Shortly thereafter he was arrested for pointing a gun at Hungarian rapper who provoked him at one of Kempi's concerts; he was arrested and sentenced to a year of imprisonment. While in prison, his debut album Du Zoon (English: Tha Son) was released by TopNotch. Du Zoon was produced by the Amsterdam production trio SoundG8 (Roel Donk, Dennis Letnom and Jihad Rahmouni). The album entered the Album Top 100 in the seventh place, though Kempi later stated that prison guards would not let Kempi listen to his own album and that he should borrow it with his own money in the prison library.

Kempi's fourth mixtape was released in 2009, Mixtape 3.2: Du Evolutie van 'n Nigga (English: Tha Evolution of a Nigga). He said it would be his last mixtape and that he would only release albums from that moment onwards. For the track "Revolution [Remix]", Kempi worked with E.D.I. Mean and Young Noble of the American rap group Outlawz, which was co-founded by hip-hop legend Tupac Shakur in 1995. On October 6, 2009 Kempi was a support act for American hip-hop star Lil Wayne during his show at the Heineken Music Hall.

In 2010 Kempi produced yet another mixtape titled Du Gangsta Tape: It's Official. For the track "The Light",  Kempi worked with Layzie Bone of the rap formation Bone Thugs-n-Harmony. On May 15, 2010, Kempi was supposed to open for American rapper 50 Cent's show at Rotterdam Ahoy. This show was cancelled however, due to disappointing ticket sales.

In June 2011 Kempi released his second studio album titled Het Testament van Zanian Adamus (English: The Testament of Zanian Adamus) which entered the Album Top 100 in fifteenth place.

On September 7, 2012, Kempi announced that he was going to quit his musical career and wants to live a normal life with his family and also stated he would like to follow an education. Kempi said: "When I see people with a nine-to-five job and a happy family, I get jealous sometimes. Because of the fortune and fame I lost everything. It feels as if I'm stuck in my own dreams now, so I want to live a normal life and get a good education. I made it from being a drugsdealer in the streets of Eindhoven to a famous person in Holland, so I'm pretty sure I can accomplish this goal too. The music and my fans are great, but everything around it isn't. He cancelled the recording for his third album but will release his last work: Mixtape 4: Rap & Glorie (De Trugkomst van PapaRasta) (English: Rap & Glory (The Return of PapaRasta)). Shortly after this statement, Kempi was sentenced to eight months imprisonment for an ongoing lawsuit of domestic violence. He came out of prison in June 2013. In September 2013, he made his musical comeback announcing his single "Trug Ben" (English: "I'm Back"). The same month however, he was sentenced to jail for prostituting a 16-year-old girl. He was released from prison on December 18, 2014.

Criminal history
In February 2007, Kempi was found guilty of assault. During the appeal he was sentenced to one month imprisonment. After spending six months  in custody, he left prison a free man.
However, in March 2007, Kempi committed another crime, he was involved in an altercation at a nightclub in Veendam, where he threatened another man with a gun. According to a newspaper someone  from his rap formation pulled a gun, according to eyewitnesses it was Kempi himself. Kempi attempted to escape when he was arrested near Zwolle. In June 2008, Kempi was sentenced to twelve months imprisonment for a series of serious crimes, including threats with a firearm.

Discography

Studio albums
Du Zoon (Tha Son) (2008, TopNotch)
Het Testament van Zanian Adamus (The Testament of Zanian Adamus)  (2011, TopNotch)
 Oompie Keke (2019, TopNotch)

Collaborations
Rap & Glorie  (Rap & Glory) (2016, TopNotch) (with The Alchemist)

Mixtapes
Tsss Kempi (2006, self-published)
Mixtape 2: Rap 'N Borie (Rap 'N Crack) (2007, TopNotch)
Mixtape 3.1 (2007, TopNotch)
Mixtape 3.2: Du Evolutie van 'n Nigga (Tha Evolution of a Nigga) (2009, TopNotch)
Du Gangsta Tape: It's Official (2010, TopNotch)
Du Movement (2011, self-published) (with Rasskulz, Crazyshee, Lens and CocoRas, as Gotti Gang)
DU4 (2017)

EP
RockNRolla (2011, self-published)
TegenK4nker EP (AgainstC4ncer EP) (2011) (Financial gainings made through this EP went to a cancer support foundation.)
PeterPanBoy EP (2012, self-published)
PPB2 (2012, self-published)

Filmography

See also
Dutch hip hop

References

External links
  Official website

1986 births
Dutch rappers
Dutch people of Curaçao descent
Dutch drug traffickers
21st-century Dutch criminals
Living people
People convicted of assault
People from Eindhoven
Converts to Islam
Dutch Muslims